Judge Sessions may refer to:

Clarence W. Sessions (1859–1931), judge of the United States District Court for the Western District of Michigan
William K. Sessions III (born 1947), judge of the United States District Court for the District of Vermont
William S. Sessions (1930–2020), judge of the United States District Court for the Western District of Texas